In the 2004 Indian general election for Gujarat polls were held for 26 seats in the state. The result was a victory for the Bharatiya Janata Party (BJP)  which won 14 seats. The remaining 12 seats were won by Indian National Congress (INC).

List of winners

External links
Election Commission of India

Gujarat
2004
2004